Aneury Rodríguez (born December 13, 1987) is a Dominican former professional baseball pitcher. He has played in Major League Baseball (MLB) for the Houston Astros and in Korea Baseball Organization (KBO) for the Samsung Lions.

Career
Rodríguez signed with the American team Colorado Rockies as an international free agent in 2005. He was traded to the Tampa Bay Rays for Jason Hammel in 2009. 

Following the 2010 season, Rodríguez was selected in the Rule 5 draft by the Houston Astros. He pitched for the Astros in 2011 and 2012. After the 2012 season, Rodríguez signed with the Samsung Lions of the Korea Baseball Organization. He pitched in 11 games for Samsung in 2013 before being released.

See also
Rule 5 draft results

References

External links 

Rodríguez – Korea Baseball Organization 
Aneury Rodríguez – Samsung Lions

1987 births
Living people
Asheville Tourists players
Casper Rockies players
Dominican Republic expatriate baseball players in South Korea
Dominican Republic expatriate baseball players in the United States
Durham Bulls players
Houston Astros players
KBO League pitchers
Major League Baseball pitchers
Major League Baseball players from the Dominican Republic
Modesto Nuts players
Montgomery Biscuits players
Oklahoma City RedHawks players
Samsung Lions players
Tri-City Dust Devils players